Ian Loughrey Palmer (11 April 1921 – 22 September 2005) was an  Australian rules footballer who played with South Melbourne in the Victorian Football League (VFL).

Palmer enlisted to serve in the Australian Army in 1942, and served in Darwin and Borneo in the latter stages of World War II.

Notes

External links 

1921 births
2005 deaths
Australian rules footballers from Victoria (Australia)
Sydney Swans players